Abdelbaki Hermassi (26 December 1937 – 23 October 2021) was a Tunisian politician. He was the Minister of Foreign Affairs of Tunisia from 10 November 2004 when he was appointed during a cabinet reshuffle, until another cabinet reshuffle on 17 August 2005 when he lost that position. He was previously the minister of culture of Tunisia. On 13 May 2008, he was named President of the Higher Communication Council.

References

1937 births
2021 deaths
Government ministers of Tunisia
Foreign ministers of Tunisia
People from Kasserine Governorate